Peirson Mitchell Hall (July 31, 1894 – December 8, 1979) was a United States district judge of the United States District Court for the Southern District of California and the United States District Court for the Central District of California.

Education and career

Born on July 31, 1894, in Armour, South Dakota, Hall attended two years of high school in Tecumseh, Nebraska. He lived in a Nebraska orphanage for a period of time before moving to Los Angeles to study law. He took a one-year course at Polytechnic High School in Los Angeles. He attended the USC Gould School of Law, then read law in 1916. He entered private practice in Los Angeles, California from 1916 to 1925. He was a city councilman for Los Angeles from 1925 to 1929. In 1929, Hall ran for election as Los Angeles city attorney but lost to Erwin P. Werner in the June final, 152,566 to 82,444. He returned to private practice in Los Angeles from 1929 to 1934. He was the United States Attorney for the Southern District of California from 1934 to 1937. He resumed private practice in Los Angeles from 1937 to 1939. He was a Judge of the Superior Court of California for the County of Los Angeles from 1939 to 1942. He was head of the Selective Service System for Southern California in 1941.

City Council service

Hall was elected to the Los Angeles City Council to represent District 11 in 1925 and was reelected in 1927. Hall, along with Clifford W. Henderson and Henry G. Bakes, "persuaded the city to lease a 640-acre bean and barley patch then known as Mines Field," which became the Los Angeles International Airport.

Federal judicial service

Hall was nominated by President Franklin D. Roosevelt on February 17, 1942, to a seat on the United States District Court for the Southern District of California vacated by Judge George Cosgrave. He was confirmed by the United States Senate on June 30, 1942, and received his commission on July 3, 1942. He served as Chief Judge from 1959 to 1964. Hall was reassigned by operation of law to the United States District Court for the Central District of California on September 18, 1966, to a new seat authorized by 80 Stat. 75. He assumed senior status on September 30, 1968. His service terminated on December 8, 1979, due to his death.

Notable cases

 Trial of an army officer charged with stealing $106,000 in Japanese gold missing since the surrender of Formosa (Taiwan) to U.S. forces at the end of World War II.
 Jailing of 10 people for refusal to answer questions in a grand jury proceeding about Los Angeles Communist leaders and organizations.
 Freeing of war crimes suspect Andrija Artukovic, former interior minister in Croatia, when Hall ruled that no extradition treaty existed between the United  States and Yugoslavia, which had sought Artukovic for trial.

Aviation law

Hall was considered the foremost authority of aviation law among the nation's 500 federal judges.

Personal

Hall was married five times. He and his first wife were divorced in 1929, and Hall sued journalist Fred H. Girnau for libel when Girnau printed a two-column article asserting that testimony at the divorce proceedings showed that Hall "used the pretty face of his wife for a punching bag." Hall's attorney declared the statement untrue and Mrs. Hall said the report was false and malicious. The longest marriage was to Gertrude May Engel, beginning in 1930. They had two daughters, Mary and Suzanne, and were divorced in 1956 after court battles that lasted several years. She died in 1964. His fourth wife was Kathryn Kyle Black, whom he married in Kansas City, Kansas, in November 1956. She died in 1970. Next he married Mari Bahn, who died in February 1973.

Memberships and death

Hall, who had been a  Mason and an Elk, died on December 8, 1979.

Note

References

Further reading
 Chronological Record of Los Angeles City Officials: 1850—1938, Compiled under Direction of Municipal Reference Library City Hall, Los Angeles March 1938 (Reprinted 1966)
 

1894 births
1979 deaths
Los Angeles City Council members
United States Attorneys for the Southern District of California
California state court judges
Judges of the United States District Court for the Southern District of California
Judges of the United States District Court for the Central District of California
United States district court judges appointed by Franklin D. Roosevelt
20th-century American judges
People from Armour, South Dakota
USC Gould School of Law alumni
People from Tecumseh, Nebraska